Boxes is a soundtrack credited to Sydney Dance Company with Iva Davies, released by Festival Records / Chrysalis Records in November 1985. The work was originally conceived by its composers, Iva Davies and Robert Kretschmer, in collaboration with choreographer Graeme Murphy of the Sydney Dance Company for performance as the ballet Boxes. The first live performance of Boxes was given by the Sydney Dance Company together with Davies and Kretschmer of Icehouse and guest percussionist Masaki Tanazawa in the Opera Theatre of the Sydney Opera House on 7 November 1985.

Track listing
All music written by Iva Davies and Bob Kretschmer

Personnel
Credits:
Music: Iva Davies, Bob Kretschmer, Masaki Tanazawa
Studio/s: Trash Studios, Sydney, Australia
Mix: Warne Livesey @ Crescent Studios, Bath, England.
Producer/s: Iva Davies and Bob Kretschmer

References

External links
 'Boxes' at Discogs

1985 soundtrack albums
Theatre soundtracks
Chrysalis Records soundtracks
Festival Records soundtracks